Estonian Powerlifting Federation (abbreviation EPF) is one of the sport governing bodies in Estonia which deals with powerlifting.

EPF is established in 1993. Before 1993 the EPF existed as a section at Estonian Weightlifting Federation.

EPF is a member of European Powerlifting Federation (EPF) and International Powerlifting Federation (IPF).

References

External links
 

Sports governing bodies in Estonia
Weightlifting in Estonia